Bouarej  (also spelled Bouarij, Bouârej, Buariji or Bwareg) is a village located on the eastern side of the Church Mountain, Beqaa.

Population
Bouarij has  1,274 registered voters in the 2009 elections. The population follow Sunni Islam. In the municipal Lebanese elections of 2004, Bouarej counted 1,905 registered voters of which 1,141 voted.

References

External links
Bouarej,  Localiban 
https://babel.hathitrust.org/cgi/pt?id=uc1.32106000420825&view=1up&seq=13&skin=mobile Buarij: Portrait Of A Lebanese Muslim Village : Fuller, Anne H:
Populated places in Zahlé District
Sunni Muslim communities in Lebanon